The 2009 Women's EuroHockey Nations Challenge I was the third edition of the Women's EuroHockey Nations Challenge I, the third level of the women's European field hockey championships organized by the European Hockey Federation. It was held in Olten, Switzerland from 9 to 15 August 2009.

The hosts Switzerland won its first EuroHockey Nations Challenge I title and were promoted to the 2011 EuroHockey Championship II.

Qualified teams

Results

Preliminary round

Classification round

Third place game

Final

Final standings

See also
2009 Men's EuroHockey Nations Challenge I
2009 Women's EuroHockey Nations Trophy

References

Women's EuroHockey Championship III
Women 3
EuroHockey Nations Challenge I
EuroHockey Nations Challenge I
Olten
International women's field hockey competitions hosted by Switzerland
EuroHockey Nations Challenge I